The 1937 season was Wisła Krakóws 29th year as a club.

Friendlies

Ekstraklasa

Squad, appearances and goals

|-
|}

Goalscorers

External links
1937 Wisła Kraków season at historiawisly.pl

Wisła Kraków seasons
Association football clubs 1937 season
Wisla